tinman, or tin is an Nk2-homeobox containing transcription factor first isolated in Drosophila flies. The human homolog is the Nkx2-5 gene. tinman is expressed in the precardiac mesoderm and is responsible for the differentiation, proliferation, and specification of cardiac progenitor cells. This gene is named after the character Tin Woodman who lacks a heart, as flies with nonfunctional tinman genes have cardiac deformities.

Function and homologues

Homeobox genes are a group of transcription factors characterized by a homeodomain that initiates gene expression which regulates cell differentiation and development when it binds to a target promoter.  tinman was first isolated in Drosophila and many vertebrate homologs have been discovered since and are considered part of a multigene family in vertebrates. The human homolog is Nkx2-5.

tinman is dependent upon the JAK-STAT signalling of the precardiac mesoderm to differentiate into a more confined growth pattern for development of visceral mesoderm and the heart. It contributes to the looping of the heart during fetal cardiac development, but has also been found to contribute to the regulation of the heart's electrical system postnatally.

Expression

tinman is expressed very early in Drosophila during the development of the embryonic mesoderm and is required for formation of the  visceral and cardiac mesoderm. It is expressed transiently in the visceral mesoderm but continues to be expressed in the cardiac mesoderm. The two major cell types of the Drosophila heart, cardial and pericardial cells, express tinman.

Clinical significance

In both Drosophila and vertebrates, the temporal and spatial expression of tinman is critical in determining cell lineage and patterning of the heart. In mutant or knockout organisms, the loss of tinman results in the lack of heart formation. In humans, mutations of Nkx2.5 result in some of the most common congenital heart defects. These include atrial and ventricular septal defects and tetralogy of Fallot. Abnormal placental expression of Nkx2.5 has been associated with some cases of severe, early onset preeclampsia.

References 

Genes
Drosophila melanogaster genes